The Hartford Line is a train service run by Amtrak primarily between Springfield, Massachusetts, and New Haven, Connecticut, along Amtrak's New Haven–Springfield Line.

Service on the line takes the form of shuttle trains, Valley Flyer trains, or Northeast Regional through trains. The shuttle trains meet Acela and Northeast Regional services at New Haven Union Station where passengers can typically make a cross-platform transfer between trains. Valley Flyer trains also offer the same connecting service at New Haven, but continue past Springfield north to Greenfield, Massachusetts. At least one Northeast Regional round trip operates daily between Washington, D.C. and Springfield, with additional through trains operating on Fridays, Saturdays, and Sundays. 

Prior to the addition of the Valley Flyer and the Northeast Regional thru trains, the service was known as the New Haven–Springfield Shuttle, or simply, the Shuttle. The line was renamed in September 2019. Today the service is a component of and shares its name with the Hartford Line commuter rail service operated by the Connecticut Department of Transportation.

During fiscal year (FY) 2020, the service carried 271,048 riders, a decrease of 44.8% from FY 2019. The drop in ridership and revenue was primarily due to the impact of the COVID-19 pandemic on tourism.

The service is financially supported by the Connecticut Department of Transportation and Massachusetts Department of Transportation.

History

As inherited from Penn Central in 1971, most service on the Springfield Line consisted of unnamed Budd Rail Diesel Car shuttles that connected with Northeast Corridor trains at New Haven, with limited through service to New York City. In 1980, Connecticut invested $12 million to improve service on the line. North Haven station was opened on October 25, 1980, and other stations were renovated. A new fleet of 12 Budd SPV-2000 diesel railcars allowed an increase to 12 daily round trips under the Connecticut Valley Service name (plus two through trips) at that time. However, service was cut in half in 1981 after ridership failed to increase.

On January 12, 1986, Amtrak pulled the unreliable SPVs from the line and replaced them with Amfleet coaches pulled by diesel locomotives. North Haven and Enfield stations were closed on October 25, 1986 due to low ridership. As New Haven was the northern limit of electrification on the Northeast Corridor, New York–Boston trains changed between electric and diesel locomotives at the station. The passenger coaches of Springfield shuttle trains were attached to southbound trains during the engine change, and detached from northbound trains; this eliminated the need for passengers to change trains. The Connecticut Valley Service name was soon dropped, and shuttle trains were named in timetables as sections of their connecting trains. The elimination of the second track on the line beginning in 1990 sharply reduced capacity, limiting frequencies to four daily shuttle round trips plus several through trips.

On October 28, 1995, most Northeast Corridor service including the shuttle trains were consolidated under the NortheastDirect brand. Electrification was extended to Boston in 2000, and engine changes were eliminated over the next two years. The cumbersome split/merge procedure was abandoned in favor of dedicated shuttle trains with cross-platform connections to through trains. The shuttle trains began to use Former Metroliner cab cars, which had become available when replaced by new equipment on West Coast routes. This allowed them to operate in push–pull format, eliminating the need to wye or loop the trainsets at New Haven and Springfield. The NortheastDirect name was dropped in September 2001; Northeast Corridor trains became the Acela Regional (later Regional then Northeast Regional), while the shuttle trains became unnamed. They remained unnamed until 2019 when they received the Hartford Line and Valley Flyer names.

Mail service

Until Amtrak discontinued all mail-hauling operations in 2005, the postal distribution center in Springfield, MA was a significant customer. Up until about the year 2000, Springfield was served by a dedicated mail train which would run overnight up the Inland Route to Springfield. After this train was canceled, mail cars were instead added to the early morning Train 190, to make pickups at large cities along the Northeast Corridor. At New Haven these mail cars would be removed from the rear of Train 190 and added to Shuttle Train 490, sometimes sandwiching the locomotive in the middle of the train.

Hartford Line expansion
Until August 2015, daily service in each direction on the Springfield Line consisted of four Shuttles, the Vermonter, and one or two Northeast Regional trains. Between August 3, 2015 and December 31, 2017, several round trips on weekdays were replaced by buses to accommodate double track construction for the ConnDOT Hartford Line commuter rail service. On June 9, 2018, three additional weekday Shuttle round trips were added as part of the startup of Hartford Line service. This change also added connections with some Amtrak Acela Express service in New Haven.

Hartford Line began on June 16, 2018. Initial Hartford Line service consisted of eight weekday round trips (four New Haven–Hartford and four New Haven–Springfield) and nine weekend round trips (six New Haven–Hartford and three New Haven–Springfield). On September 10, 2018, as part of a schedule change made to Hartford Line trains, all Amtrak Shuttles and Northeast Regionals started stopping at New Haven's State Street station. (The Vermonter makes only limited stops between New Haven and Springfield.)

Amtrak adopted the Hartford Line name for use on the trains it operates on the corridor and retired the Shuttle designation in September 2019. Service was reduced in 2020 during the COVID-19 pandemic; service levels were restored to pre-COVID frequency on April 25, 2022. Most service will be replaced by buses from July 18 to September 9, 2022, during canopy roof replacement at Hartford Union Station and slope stabilization work in Windsor.

Valley Flyer pilot program
By February 2019, the two-year pilot was expected to begin in June 2019; however, by that May it was delayed to later in the year. On August 30, 2019, the Valley Flyer program began. Two round trips are offered on weekdays and one on weekends with southbound trains in the morning and northbound in the evening which complement Amtrak's existing daily service on the Vermonter. Additionally a reverse round trip operates between Springfield and Greenfield on weekends only.

Operation
The local Hartford Line trains are numbered in the 400 series, usually denoting by the last two digits which Northeast Regional train the Hartford Line train is connecting with. Trains terminating in Springfield carry the Hartford Line name, while trains terminating in Greenfield carry the Valley Flyer designation. Typical consists run in push-pull configuration with a General Electric P42DC locomotive pulling an Amfleet coach and a 9600-series ex-Metroliner cab car. Normally the ex-Budd Metroliner leads northbound trains, while the GE Genesis usually leads most southbound trains. Crew bases are at Springfield and New Haven, with diesel locomotive servicing taking place at New Haven.

The Valley Flyer trains account for two weekday round trips and one weekend round trip. Southbound Valley Flyer trains require an equipment move from the crew base and equipment layover yard at Springfield Union Station to the Olver Transit Center in Greenfield prior to the Greenfield departure as Amtrak does not have any crew or turnaround facilities in the area. Likewise, equipment and crews on northbound trips must dead head back to Springfield after unloading all Greenfield passengers. For the weekend Valley Flyer, tickets are available for these moves (trains 400 and 499.) On weekdays, these trips are dead head moves and are not open to passengers. Another unique operational aspect of the Valley Flyer is the need for the push pull trains to reverse directions twice at Springfield during the trip due to the station’s location just to the east of the intersection between the Amtrak Springfield Line, MassDOT Connecticut River Line, and CSX Berkshire Subdivision.

The New Haven–Springfield corridor is served by all Northeast Regional trains in the 140 series (except trains 145 and 149) as well as trains 136 and 157. The corridor is also served by Amtrak's Vermonter.

Fares
The Hartford Line and Valley Flyer service operates as a component of CTDOT's Hartford Line commuter rail program along with CTDOT's own CTrail trains and reduced fixed commuter level fares are offered for local travel on the service between all stations inclusive of and between New Haven Union Station and Springfield Union Station on both the 400 series trains and the Northeast Regional through trains which travel beyond New Haven. CTDOT issued rail passes and CTrail tickets are also accepted on these trains. Intercity rail trips that include travel beyond New Haven are subject to normal Amtrak fares as well as travel along the Valley Flyer extension to Greenfield, MA. Amtrak's Vermonter trains which also travel along the corridor are excluded from the commuter level fares.

Stations

References

Notes

External links

Amtrak Hartford Line

New Haven–Springfield Line
Amtrak routes
Passenger rail transportation in Connecticut
Passenger rail transportation in Massachusetts